Stoke upon Tern is a civil parish in Shropshire, England.  It contains 21 listed buildings that are recorded in the National Heritage List for England.  Of these, one is listed at Grade II*, the middle of the three grades, and the others are at Grade II, the lowest grade.  The parish includes the villages of Stoke on Tern, Ollerton, and Wistanswick and smaller settlements, and is otherwise rural.  Most of the listed buildings are farmhouses and farm buildings, many of which are timber framed.  The other listed buildings consist of a church with groups of coffin slabs and a former font in the churchyard, another church, a row of cottages, two milestones, a bridge, and an animal pound.


Key

Buildings

References

Citations

Sources

Lists of buildings and structures in Shropshire